= Mir Adal =

Pakistani politician

Syed Muhammad Naqvi held a prominent judicial position (Mir-i-Adl) in the court of Akbar the Great; but he was not the Chief Justice (Qazi-ul-Quzzat), contrary to common misconception. Born at Amroha around 1500, Syed Muhammad was educated at Amroha, Sambhal (the then provincial capital), and Badaun. He was very pious and conservative, which put him at odds with the growing liberalism of the Emperor. Presumably due to this, after serving the court at Agra from 1558/1559 to 1576-1577, he was shunted to Bakkar (Sindh) as its governor. His most notable contributions in this capacity were implementing tax reforms and overcoming a rebellion at Sibi (now in Baluchistan). The force that conquered Sibi fort from the rebels was led by Syed Muhammad’s son, Abul Fazl, and also included his two other sons, Syed Abul Maoli and Syed Abul Qasim. Syed Muhammad died at Bakkar in 1578/1579.
